Santo Tomás is Spanish for Saint Thomas.

Santo Tomas may also refer to:

Places

Argentina 
 Santo Tomás, Buenos Aires, Carlos Casares Partido, Buenos Aires Province
 Santo Tomás, Neuquén

Colombia 
Santo Tomás, Atlantico

Cuba 
Santo Tomás, Cuba, Ciego de Ávila Province

El Salvador 
Santo Tomás, El Salvador

Guatemala 
Santo Tomás de Castilla, Izabal Department
Santo Tomás La Unión, Suchitepéquez Department
Volcán Santo Tomás

Mexico 
 Santo Tomas Copper Deposit, Sinaloa, Mexico 
 Misión Santo Tomás de Aquino, in Baja California
 Santo Tomás, Baja California
 Santo Tomás de los Plátanos, in México
 Santo Tomás Jalieza, in Oaxaca
 Santo Tomás Mazaltepec, in Oaxaca
 Santo Tomás Ocotepec, in Oaxaca
 Santo Tomás Tamazulapan, in Oaxaca
 Santo Tomas, Sonora

Nicaragua 
 Santo Tomás, Chontales

Panama 
 Santo Tomás, Chiriquí
 Santo Tomás metro station

Peru 
 Santo Tomás District, Luya, in Luya province, Amazonas region
 Santo Tomás District, Cutervo, in Cutervo province, Cajamarca region
 Santo Tomás District, Chumbivilcas, in Chumbivilcas province, Cusco region
 Santo Tomás de Pata District, in Angaraes province, Huancavelica region

Philippines 
 Santo Tomas, Batangas
 Santo Tomas, Davao del Norte
 Santo Tomas, Isabela
 Santo Tomas, La Union
 Santo Tomas, Pampanga
 Santo Tomas, Pangasinan
 Mount Santo Tomas

Spain 
 Santo Tomas, Menorca

United States 
 Santo Tomás, Texas

Other uses
Convento de Santo Tomás (Madrid), a former convent
 University of Santo Tomas, in Manila, Philippines
 Santo Tomas Internment Camp in the Philippines
 Domingo de Santo Tomás Spanish Dominican bishop and grammarian in the Viceroyalty of Peru

See also 
 Santo Tomás District (disambiguation)
 Saint Thomas (disambiguation)